The discography of Japanese R&B singer Toshinobu Kubota consists of nineteen studio albums, ten compilation albums, two tribute albums, and over seventy singles. In 1985, Kubota signed with Sony Japan and began producing and writing songs for many of label's singers and groups. Under the label, Kubota released his first single, "Shitsui no Downtown" in June 1986, followed by "Time Shower ni Utarete" in December. Both songs were well received by radio, placing fifty-three and thirty-five on the Oricon Singles Chart. In September 1986, his debut album, Shake It Paradise, peaked at number twenty-two and remained on the Oricon Albums Chart for seven consecutive weeks. Shake It Paradise became certified million. The following year in 1987, Kubota's second studio album, Groovin', debuted at number thirty-three and was certified million. In February 1988, Kubota released "You Were Mine", which debuted at number two. In September 1988, Kubota released his third album, Such A Funky Thang!. The album peaked at number one and was certified million. The album also spawned the top-charted single "Dance If You Want It", which peaked at number three. In 1989, Kubota released his compilation album, The Baddest. The album also peaked at number one and was certified million.

Kubota's fourth studio album, Bonga Wanga, was released in July 1990. The album, like its predecessors, peaked at number one and became certified million. Following the next three years, Kubota released "Kubojah: Parallel World I", "Neptune", and "The Baddest II". In 1994, he relocated to New York in the United States of America and began working on upcoming album. In January 1995, he released seventh album, Bumpin' Voyage. The album spawned the top-five hit "Yoru ni Dakarete (A Night in Afro Blue)".

In September 1995, Kubota released an English version of Bumpin' Voyage, which was titled Sunshine, Moonlight, his eighth album. The album peaked at number one and sold over a half million records worldwide. In May 1996, Kubota released "La La La Love Song." The single became Kubota's first number one hit. The single also became certified million selling over two million copies worldwide. The song was also used as the theme song of Japanese television drama series Long Vacation. In December 1996, the album La La La Love Thang was released. The album peaked at number two and became certified double platinum, selling over 840,00 copies. In following years, Kubota released three non-album singles "Cymbals" (1997), "Ahhhhh!" (1998), and "Soul Bangin'" (1999). In 2000, Kubota released the albums Nothing But Your Love (second English-language album) and As One, which both albums charted in the top ten. In the following years, Kubota went on to release the albums United Flow (2002), Time to Share (his third English-language album) (2004), and For Real? (2006).

After a four-year hiatus, Kubota released his fifteenth album, Timeless Fly in February 2010. The album charted at number nine on the Oricon Albums Chart. In November 2010, Kubota released his sixth compilation album Love & Rain: Love Songs. The lead single "Love Rain (Koi no Ame)" charted at number three on the Oricon Singles chart. Kubota released his sixteenth album, Gold Skool, in August 2011. The album charted at number three, selling over 33,000 copies in its first week of release. Kubota released "The Baddest: Hit Parade" in November 2011, which peaked at number two. As of July 2012, Kubota has sold over twelve million records to date. In March 2015, Kubota released "L.O.K." The album peaked at number three on the Oricon Weekly Albums chart and sold 21,285 copies in its first week of release.

Albums

Studio albums

Compilation albums

Other albums

Singles

As featured artist

Promotional singles

Soundtrack appearances

Production credits

Videos

Video albums

References

External links
 
 
 Official website
 Toshinobu Kubota at Sony Music Japan
 Toshinobu Kubota at Discogs

Discographies of Japanese artists
Rhythm and blues discographies
Pop music discographies
Discography